In  algebra, given a ring homomorphism , there are three ways to change the coefficient ring of a module; namely, for a left R-module M and a left S-module N,
, the induced module.
, the coinduced module.
, the restriction of scalars.
They are related as adjoint functors:

and

This is related to Shapiro's lemma.

Operations

Restriction of scalars
Throughout this section, let  and  be two rings (they may or may not be commutative, or contain an identity), and let  be a homomorphism. Restriction of scalars changes S-modules into R-modules. In algebraic geometry, the term "restriction of scalars" is often used as a synonym for Weil restriction.

Definition 

Interpretation as a functor 

Restriction of scalars can be viewed as a functor from -modules to -modules.

 .

As a functor, restriction of scalars is the right adjoint of the extension of scalars functor.

If  is the ring of integers, then this is just the forgetful functor from modules to abelian groups.

Extension of scalars

Extension of scalars changes R-modules into S-modules.

Definition 
Consider the tensor product , where  is regarded as a left -module via . This module is said to be obtained from  through extension of scalars.

Informally, extension of scalars is "the tensor product of a ring and a module"; more formally, it is a special case of a tensor product of a bimodule and a module – the tensor product of an R-module with an -bimodule is an S-module.

Examples 
One of the simplest examples is complexification, which is extension of scalars from the real numbers to the complex numbers. More generally, given any field extension K < L, one can extend scalars from K to L. In the language of fields, a module over a field is called a vector space, and thus extension of scalars converts a vector space over K to a vector space over L. This can also be done for division algebras, as is done in quaternionification (extension from the reals to the quaternions).

More generally, given a homomorphism from a field or commutative ring R to a ring S, the ring S can be thought of as an associative algebra over R, and thus when one extends scalars on an R-module, the resulting module can be thought of alternatively as an S-module, or as an R-module with an algebra representation of S (as an R-algebra). For example, the result of complexifying a real vector space (R = R, S = C) can be interpreted either as a complex vector space (S-module) or as a real vector space with a linear complex structure (algebra representation of S as an R-module).

Applications 
This generalization is useful even for the study of fields – notably, many algebraic objects associated to a field are not themselves fields, but are instead rings, such as algebras over a field, as in representation theory. Just as one can extend scalars on vector spaces, one can also extend scalars on group algebras and also on modules over group algebras, i.e., group representations. Particularly useful is relating how irreducible representations change under extension of scalars – for example, the representation of the cyclic group of order 4, given by rotation of the plane by 90°, is an irreducible 2-dimensional real representation, but on extension of scalars to the complex numbers, it split into 2 complex representations of dimension 1. This corresponds to the fact that the characteristic polynomial of this operator,  is irreducible of degree 2 over the reals, but factors into 2 factors of degree 1 over the complex numbers – it has no real eigenvalues, but 2 complex eigenvalues.

Interpretation as a functor 

Extension of scalars can be interpreted as a functor from -modules to -modules.

Co-extension of scalars (coinduced module)

Relation between the extension of scalars and the restriction of scalars 

Consider an -module  and an -module . Given a homomorphism , define  to be the composition
,
This  is an -homomorphism, and hence  is well-defined, and is a homomorphism (of abelian groups).

In case both  and  have an identity, there is an inverse homomorphism , which is defined as follows. Let . Then  is the composition
,
where the first map is the canonical isomorphism .

Actually, this isomorphism depends only on the homomorphism , and so is functorial. In the language of category theory, the extension of scalars functor is left adjoint to the restriction of scalars functor.

See also 
Six operations
Tensor product of fields
Tensor-hom adjunction

References 
 
J.P. May, Notes on Tor and Ext
NICOLAS BOURBAKI. Algebra I, Chapter II. LINEAR ALGEBRA.§5. Extension of the ring of scalars;§7. Vector spaces. 1974 by Hermann.

Further reading 
Induction and Coinduction of Representations

Commutative algebra
Ring theory
Adjoint functors